Nyctemera formosana is a moth of the family Erebidae first described by Charles Swinhoe in 1908. It is found in Taiwan.

References

Moths described in 1908
Nyctemerina